The list a list of all members of the Senate for GroenLinks. Their previous memberships of parties preceding GreenLeft is listed as well, if applicable.

Current Senate members are in bold.

 2
Greenleft
GreenLeft, Senate